The Angel is an Israeli spy thriller film directed by Ariel Vromen and starring Marwan Kenzari and Toby Kebbell among others. It is an adaptation of the non-fiction book The Angel: The Egyptian Spy Who Saved Israel written by Uri Bar-Joseph. It is a fictional account of an Ashraf Marwan, a high-ranking Egyptian official who became a double agent for both countries and helped achieve peace between the two.

Plot
During the Six-Day War in 1967, Israel conquers and occupies large areas of land including the Sinai Peninsula which then (and now) belonged to Egypt.

On September 3, 1973, Ashraf Marwan meets Arab terrorists outside Rome International Airport, with a missile launcher that he smuggled into Italy in his suitcase. He tells the terrorists that he must leave immediately, as he is an Egyptian diplomat who cannot be discovered at the place of the attack, while the insurgents aim the launcher at a commercial airliner that is heading to Israel.

Three years earlier, in 1970, Ashraf lives and studies in London with his wife, Mona, the daughter of Egyptian President Gamal Abdel Nasser, and their son. Ashraf disagrees with Nasser on how to proceed in the Israeli conflict and suggests that Nasser prevent further bloodshed and try a diplomatic solution with Israel, with the US as a peace-broker. However, Nasser and his men fear this will lose them the support of the USSR. Realising the USSR is on its last legs, Ashraf insists Egypt cuts its ties with the Soviets. Nasser rebukes Ashraf, and afterwards urges Mona to divorce her husband, which Ashraf overhears.

Angry and embarrassed, Ashraf is further humiliated when he finds out that Nasser, on whom they are financially dependent, is having him followed when he goes out with friends, causing Mona to worry that Ashraf is having an affair with actress Diana Ellis. Frustrated, Ashraf decides to call the Israeli Ambassador to the United Kingdom, Michael Comay, to share important information. When the embassy refuses to connect him to Comay, Ashraf hangs up.

Soon after, President Nasser dies of a heart attack, and Ashraf and his family are recalled to Cairo. Vice President Anwar Sadat becomes the next president of Egypt. Ashraf wins Sadat's trust by uncovering high-level corruption within the Egyptian government, and slowly begins to climb the political ladder, eventually becoming an important political player in Egypt. His family life suffers from his political career although Ashraf finds time to read his son a bed-time story, The Boy Who Cried Wolf.

Back in London, Mossad agents finally reach out to Ashraf, playing him a recording of his previous call to the Israeli embassy. Ashraf meets his Mossad handler, Alex, and begins to sell his country's secrets to the Israeli government. The information that Ashraf provides is initially reliable and Alex and Ashraf develop a mutual rapport, with Ashraf being codenamed "the angel." Eventually, however, Ashraf warns the Israelis on two occasions that Egypt will launch a military invasion, which never comes to pass. This puts a severe strain on his relationship with Mossad, who start doubting Ashraf's trustworthiness.

When Israel shoots down a Libyan commercial plane filled with civilians, Libyan leader Muammar Gaddafi wants vengeance, but Sadat is not willing to attack civilians. Knowing it will anger Gaddafi and the other Arab nations if Egypt does not support Libya, Ashraf comes up with a ploy to stabilize the situation. He goes to Gaddafi to pledge Egypt's support but makes sure that their retaliatory attack is not successful.

Back at Rome International Airport on September 3, 1973, Ashraf removes a pin from the missile launcher before giving it to the terrorists, making it ineffective. When the Israeli commercial airliner takes off, the launcher does not fire. Italian authorities, having been notified about the terrorists by Ashraf, apprehend them.

Having regained Mossad's trust, Ashraf informs Alex and Mossad chief Zvi Zamir about an imminent Egyptian invasion of Israel on Yom Kippur. However, Israel dismisses the warning as yet another false alarm, like the previous two warnings. It is then revealed that this was Ashraf's plan all along, inspired by the fable of the Boy Who Cried Wolf. Realizing that peace could only be achieved through diplomacy, not war, but also realizing Israel would not agree to peace talks while they had the military upper hand, Ashraf decided to pave the way for a short but successful surprise attack on Israel. A military stalemate between Israel and Egypt ensues in the Yom Kippur War, peace talks begin and the two countries finally broker a peace treaty which heralds a period of lasting peace and sees both Sadat and Menachem Begin receive the Nobel Peace Prize. At the same time, Ashraf's marriage to Mona ends as Mona, kept in the dark about Ashraf's plan, believes his frequent trips abroad and continued friendship with Diana Ellis -  in actuality strategic parts of his mission - confirm that he is having an affair.

Years later, Alex meets Ashraf, gifts him a copy of Aesop's Fables and informs him that he has recognized the Boy Who Cried Wolf strategy. Ashraf responds that no matter what happened, if peace came out of it, everyone is better off.

An epilogue states that Ashraf died mysteriously in 2007 when he fell from the balcony of his London flat. He is the only man to be recognized as a national hero in both Israel and Egypt.

Cast

 Marwan Kenzari as Ashraf Marwan, an Egyptian diplomat, who is the son-in-law of President Nasser
 Toby Kebbell as Alex, a relatively inexperienced Canadian-Israeli Mossad handler whose real name is Danny Ben Aroya
 Sasson Gabai as Anwar Sadat, Vice President and later President of Egypt
 Waleed Zuaiter as Gamal Abdel Nasser, long-serving President of Egypt
 Ori Pfeffer as Zvi Zamir, director of the Mossad
 Maisa Abd Elhadi as Mona Marwan, Ashraf's wife and daughter of President Nasser
 Hannah Ware as Diana Ellis, an English actress
 Tsahi Halevi as Muammar Gadaffi, the leader of Libya
 Guy Adler as Gideon Vromen, a Mossad agent tasked with following Ashraf
 Mickey Leon as Judah Hornstein, an experienced Mossad handler
 Slimane Dazi as Sami Sharaf, Minister for Presidential Affairs under Nasser
 Mounir Margoum as Babak, a friend of Sami Sharaf who stays loyal to him after his imprisonment
 Mali Levi as Natalie Ben Aroya, Alex/Danny's wife

Production
On May 5, 2017, it was announced that Marwan Kenzari was set to star in The Angel for director Ariel Vromen from a screenplay by David Arata, with Netflix distributing the film.

The film began production in early July 2017 in London, England and also was shot in the United Kingdom, Bulgaria, and Morocco. The rest of the cast was confirmed on July 25, 2017, with the film in principal production.

Release
The film was released on September 14, 2018, although originally it was scheduled for June 15, 2018.

Reception

Critical response

References

External links
 

2018 films
2010s spy thriller films
English-language Netflix original films
Films about the Mossad
American spy thriller films
Israeli thriller films
Films directed by Ariel Vromen
Films scored by Pinar Toprak
Arabic-language Netflix original films
Hebrew-language Netflix original films
2010s American films